Hook's Drug Stores was an Indianapolis, Indiana-based drug store chain which was founded in 1900 by John A. Hook. The chain flourished throughout central Indiana for most of the 20th-century.

Hook's did business under its own banner, the SupeRX Drug Stores banner outside its core market, and the Brooks Pharmacy banner after acquiring the New England pharmacy chain. The entire company was eventually purchased by fellow Midwestern drugstore chain Revco.

Most former Hook's locations that are still open operate as CVS, which bought out Revco in the late 1990s and rebranded their stores as CVS. The Brooks Pharmacy stores were divested by Revco after the purchase; most of them operate as Rite Aid stores.

History

In October 1900, pharmacist John A. Hook opened the first Hook's Drug Store in an Indianapolis German community at the corner of South East and Prospect Streets. A second location opened at the corner of New Jersey and East Washington Streets and Hook added Edward F. Roesch as a partner. By 1912, the chain had expanded to twelve stores. Many of Hook's interwar drug stores were designed by Kurt Vonnegut Sr. of Vonnegut & Bohn. Roesch became president of the company in 1943 upon Hook's death. In 1956, following Roesch's death in a traffic accident, John Hook's son, August F. “Bud” Hook, assumed leadership of the company. The chain added 150 new stores between 1946 and 1972.

In 1985, The Kroger Company outbid Rite Aid, which had attempted a hostile takeover, and acquired the Hook's chain. Kroger divested itself of Hook's and its own SupeRx drugstores a year later, and Hook's became a division of the privately held Hook’s-SupeRx.

Hook's-SupeRx acquired the New England-based Brooks Pharmacy chain in 1988. Hooks-SupeRx stores traded under three different names - Hook's Drug and SupeRx in the Midwest and Brooks Pharmacy in New England. Hook's-SupeRx was acquired by Revco in 1994. Revco was subsequently acquired by CVS in 1997. Many former Hook's locations are now CVS Pharmacies.

A restored 19th-century Hook's drug store stands at the Indiana State Fairgrounds, and is a popular attraction at the annual Indiana State Fair. It was originally built in 1849 and has been restored with authentic 19th century cabinets.

Hook's Apothecary
In 2000, the great-grandchildren of John A. Hook opened Hook's Apothecary in Evansville, Indiana. The store specializes in compounding prescriptions. It has no corporate ties to CVS.

Hook's Oxygen and Medical Equipment
After Hook's was sold to Revco, the Oxygen and Medical Equipment stores continued under the Hook's name in many of the same locations as before. It is now a subsidiary of Rotech Medical Corporation.

References

External links
Hook's Drug Store Museum and Soda Fountain
Hook's Apothecary
SupeRx TV Commercial

CVS Health
Defunct pharmacies of the United States
Defunct companies based in Indianapolis
American companies established in 1900
Retail companies established in 1900
Retail companies disestablished in 1994
1900 establishments in Indiana
1994 disestablishments in Indiana
Health care companies based in Indiana